Facelis retusa, the annual trampweed, is a South American species flowering plants in the family Asteraceae. It is native  Brazil, Bolivia, Paraguay, Uruguay, northern Argentina, Chile; naturalized in parts of Africa, Australia, and North America including the southeastern and south-central United States, and considered as a noxious weed in some of those places.

Facelis retusa is an annual herb with the stems up to 30 cm (1-foot) long, very often trailing along the surface of the ground. Flower heads are in clusters, with white or purple disc flowers but no ray flowers. The achene has several long, feathery bristles that give a white appearance and assure effective seed dispersal.

References

External links
TurfFiles - North Carolina State University photos, description on weed control methods
Southeastern Flora several photos
Alabama Plants photo

Gnaphalieae
Flora of South America
Plants described in 1788